Ganda Singh (15 November 1900 – 27 November 1987)  was a Punjabi historian and Padma Bhushan awardee. In addition to scores of research papers, booklets and pamphlets, he published over two dozen full-length volumes of historical value.

Early life
Dr. Ganda Singh was born on 15 November 1900, at Hariana, a town in Hoshiarpur district of  British Punjab. He was schooled in the local Government Middle School and then the D.A.V. Middle School. He matriculated from Government High School, Hoshiarpur. Then he went to the Forman Christian College, Lahore.

Researcher and historian
In October 1931 began Dr Ganda Singh's long and fruitful career as a researcher and historian. The Khalsa College, Amritsar placed him in charge of its newly created Sikh History Research Department, a position he kept till 1949. During this period he travelled extensively, rummaging various public libraries, archives and private collections throughout India in quest of materials on Sikh history, enriching the library of his department. He also brought out several books and articles based on these.

In 1938, he had been appointed a corresponding member of Indian Historical Records Commission of Government of India, and was a full member of the Commission from 1950 to 1956.

In 1949, he was appointed Director of Archives and Curator of Museum under the Government of Patiala and East Punjab States Union. In 1950 he received the additional charge of Director of the Punjabi Department. His thesis on Afghan warlord Ahmad Shah Durrani earned him the degree of Doctor of Philosophy from the Punjab University, Chandigarh, in 1954, as well as much applause from scholars and historians, including  Maulana Abul Kalam Azad.

Dr Ganda Singh was principal of the Khalsa College, Patiala, when he was invited by the Punjabi University, Patiala, to organize its Department of Punjab Historical Studies. in 1965, he set up Punjab History Conference. In 1967, he launched the University's journal, the biannual The Panjab Past and Present, of which he was the editor.

He was nominated member of Punjab Regional Committee for the Survey of Historical Records, Government of Punjab, Lahore, and of Indian Historical Records Commission, Government of India. He was secretary of the Committee for the History of Freedom Movement in PEPSU, Patiala, and chairman of the Regional Records Survey Committee for History of Freedom Movement, Shimla/Patiala, from November 1957 to December 1962. He held membership of The Asiatic Society, Calcutta, Indian Institute of Historical Studies, Calcutta, Royal Asiatic Society of Great Britain and Ireland and Bharat Itihas Sanshodhak Mandal, Pune. He presided over the medieval section of Punjab History Conference session of the Institute of Historical Studies, Calcutta, held at Shillong in 1974 as well as over its 13th session held at Panaji (Goa) in 1975. In 1974, he presided the 35th session of Indian History Congress at Jadavpur.

Awards
The Government of India honoured him with Padma Bhushan award in 1984.

He had two honorary degrees of Doctor of Letters awarded to him, by Aligarh Muslim University on 19 December 1964 and by Punjabi University on 25 February 1978.

The Punjab Government invested him with the Award for Literature on 31 March 1963. On 28 March 1964, the Shiromani Gurdwara Parbandhak Committee officially commended him. "Sikh Educational Conference" honoured him during its 52nd annual session held at Kanpur on 25–27 October 1974, and Punjabi University, Patiala, at the annual session of the Punjab History Conference held during November 1976. The University also brought out during the same year an anthology, Essays in Honour of Dr Ganda Singh, edited by his old pupil Professor Harbans Singh. The Indian History Congress during its Silver Jubilee session held at Panaji (Goa) on 27 November 1987 honoured him as one of the five distinguished historians of India.

Death
Dr. Singh died at Patiala on 27 November 1987.

Legacy
He donated his entire personal collection of rare books, maps, documents and manuscripts, which occupied several rooms of his modest residence on the Lower Mall at Patiala, to Punjabi University, Patiala.

References

1900 births
1987 deaths
People from Hoshiarpur district